The 2019 Major League Baseball postseason was the playoff tournament of Major League Baseball for the 2019 season. The winners of the League Division Series would move on to the League Championship Series to determine the pennant winners that face each other in the World Series.

In the American League, the Houston Astros and New York Yankees returned for the fourth time in the past five years, the Minnesota Twins returned for the second time in three years, the Oakland Athletics made their fifth appearance in the past eight years, and the Tampa Bay Rays returned for the first time since 2013. This was the second postseason in a row in which the American League had at least three teams finish the regular season with 100 or more wins (Astros, Yankees, Twins).

In the National League, the Los Angeles Dodgers made their seventh straight appearance, the Atlanta Braves and Milwaukee Brewers clinched a postseason berth for the second year in a row, the St. Louis Cardinals made their first postseason appearance since 2015, and the Washington Nationals made their fifth appearance in the past nine years. The Dodgers also finished with at least 100 regular season wins, making this the first postseason to feature four 100-win teams.

The postseason began on October 1, and ended on October 30, with the Nationals upsetting the heavily-favored Astros in seven games in the 2019 World Series. It was the first title in franchise history for the Nationals, and the first World Series title won by a team from Washington, D.C. since 1924.

Playoff seeds
The following teams qualified for the postseason:

American League
 Houston Astros - 107–55, Clinched AL West
 New York Yankees - 103–59, Clinched AL East
 Minnesota Twins - 101–61, Clinched AL Central
 Oakland Athletics - 97–65
 Tampa Bay Rays - 96–66

National League
 Los Angeles Dodgers - 106–56, Clinched NL West
 Atlanta Braves - 97–65, Clinched NL East
 St. Louis Cardinals - 91–71, Clinched NL Central
 Washington Nationals - 93–69
 Milwaukee Brewers - 89–73

Playoff bracket

American League Wild Card

(4) Oakland Athletics vs. (5) Tampa Bay Rays 

The Rays defeated the Athletics 5–1 to advance to the ALDS for the first time since 2013.

National League Wild Card

(4) Washington Nationals vs. (5) Milwaukee Brewers 

The Nationals rallied from an early 3–0 deficit to defeat the Brewers by a final score of 4–3 to advance to the NLDS.

American League Division Series

(1) Houston Astros vs. (5) Tampa Bay Rays 

This was the first postseason meeting between the Astros and Rays. The Astros defeated the Rays in five games to return to the ALCS for the third year in a row. Both teams would meet again in the 2020 ALCS, which the Rays won in seven games despite the Astros coming back from a 3–0 series deficit to force a seventh game.

(2) New York Yankees vs. (3) Minnesota Twins 

This was the sixth postseason match-up between Minnesota and New York. The previous five meetings were in the ALDS in 2003, 2004, 2009, and 2010, as well as the 2017 AL Wild Card Game — with the Yankees winning each of those prior meetings. This was just the second time the ALDS featured a match-up of two 100-win teams, following the 2018 ALDS.

The Yankees again swept the Twins to advance to the ALCS for the second time in three years. The loss gave Minnesota its 16th straight postseason defeat, 13 of those in games against the Yankees; and their 28th straight year without winning the title.

National League Division Series

(1) Los Angeles Dodgers vs. (4) Washington Nationals 

This was the third postseason meeting between these two teams. The Nationals upset the 106-win Dodgers in five games to return to the NLCS for the first time since 1981, when the team was then known as the Montreal Expos.

(2) Atlanta Braves vs. (3) St. Louis Cardinals 

This was the fifth postseason meeting between the Cardinals and Braves. The Cardinals defeated the Braves in five games to advance to the NLCS for the first time since 2014. With the win, the Cardinals moved up to 4–1 against the Braves in the postseason, having won in 1982, 2000, and 2012.

American League Championship Series

(1) Houston Astros vs. (2) New York Yankees 

This was the third postseason meeting between the Yankees and Astros. The previous two meetings (2015, 2017) were won by the Astros. History once again repeated itself, and the Astros defeated the Yankees in six games to return to the World Series for the second time in three years, capped off by a walk-off two-run home run by José Altuve off Aroldis Chapman in the bottom of the ninth inning of Game 6.

The Astros returned to the ALCS the next year, but fell to the Tampa Bay Rays in seven games. They would win their next pennant in 2021, against the Boston Red Sox in six games.

With the series loss, this marked the first decade since the 1910s that the Yankees failed to win the AL pennant.

National League Championship Series

(4) Washington Nationals vs. (3) St. Louis Cardinals 

This was the second postseason meeting between the Nationals and Cardinals. This NLCS marked the first time that the Nationals franchise had ever played in a seven-game playoff series. The Nationals swept the Cardinals to reach the World Series for the first time in franchise history.

As of 2022, this is the last time the Cardinals appeared in the NLCS.

2019 World Series

(AL1) Houston Astros vs. (NL4) Washington Nationals 

This was the second World Series to feature two expansion teams, as well as the first World Series since 1933 to come to Washington, D.C., when the Washington Senators fell to the New York Giants in five games. In the first championship series in the history of North American sports in which neither team won a home game, the Nationals pulled off one of the biggest upsets in World Series history, defeating the heavily-favored Astros in seven games. 

The Nationals took Game 1 narrowly, and blew out the Astros in Game 2 to go up 2-0 in the series heading back to Washington, D.C. The Astros held the Nationals to one run in each of the next three games to take a 3-2 series lead going back to Houston. In Game 6, the Nationals blew out the Astros to force a seventh game. The Astros held a 2-0 lead going into the top of the seventh, when the Nationals’ Anthony Rendon hit a solo home run to cut the Astros’ lead to one. Then, Howie Kendrick hit a two-run home run to put the Nationals in the lead for good. The Nationals then scored three more unanswered runs in the top of the eighth and ninth innings to complete a major upset and secure the title.

It was the first World Series title in franchise history for the Nationals, as well as the first World Series title for the nation's capital since 1924, when the Senators defeated the Giants in seven games. Despite the win, no MLB team from the nation's capital had won a home game in the World Series since 1933.

Along with the Washington Capitals winning the 2018 Stanley Cup Finals, the Nationals and Capitals brought the first major league championships to D.C. since 1992, when the Washington Redskins won Super Bowl XXVI.

To date, this is the last postseason appearance by the Nationals franchise. The Astros returned to the World Series in 2021, but they were defeated by the Atlanta Braves in six games.

References

External links
 League Baseball Standings & Expanded Standings - 2019

 
Major League Baseball postseason